Richard Brendan Higgins KC*HS, USAF (ret) (born February 22, 1944) is an Irish-born American bishop of the Roman Catholic Church. Higgins served as an auxiliary bishop of the Archdiocese for the Military Services, USA from 2004 to 2020.

Biography

Early life 
Higgins was born on February 22, 1944, in Longford, County Longford, Ireland.  He studied for the priesthood at the Pontifical Irish College in Rome, attending the Pontifical Lateran University.

Priesthood 
On March 9, 1968, Higgins was ordained a priest for the Diocese of Sacramento at the Basilica of St. John Lateran in Rome. After arriving in California, Higgins served pastoral assignments in Roseville, California, and Grass Valley, California.

In September 1974, Higgins joined the United States Air Force Chaplain Corps. His assignments as chaplain included:

 Lowry Air Force Base in Denver Colorado
 Naval Air Station Keflavik in Iceland
 Laughlin Air Force Base in Del Rio, Texas
 Bitburg Air Base in Bitburg, Germany
 Malmstrom AFB in Great Falls, Montana 
 Maxwell Air Force Base in Montgomery Alabama
 Royal Air Force Lakenheath in Lakenheath, United Kingdom
 Nellis AFB in Las Vega, Nevada
 Pope AFB in Fayetteville, North Carolina

Higgins's postings also included the Air Command and Staff College in Montgomery, Alabama, the United States Air Force Academy in Colorado Springs, Colorado, Headquarters United States Air Forces Europe in at Ramstein Air Bas in Germany, and Headquarters Pacific Air Forces in Honolulu, Hawaii.  While serving in the USAF, Higgins was awarded an Airline Transport Pilot Certificate and several flight instructor certificates.

In 1997, Pope John Paul II named Higgins an honorary prelate of his holiness, with the title of monsignor.

Auxiliary Bishop of the Military Services, USA
On May 7, 2004, John Paul II appointed Higgins as an auxiliary bishop of the Archdiocese of the Military Services, USA and as titular bishop of Casae Calanae. He was consecrated on July 3, 2004, at the Basilica of the National Shrine of the Immaculate Conception in Washington, D.C. His principal consecrator was Archbishop Edwin O'Brien; his co-consecrators were Bishop Howard Hubbard and Bishop William Weigand.

On September 1, 2004, Higgins retired from the US Air Force with the rank of colonel. His military decorations include the Legion of Merit with one oak leaf cluster and the Air Force Meritorious Service Medal with seven oak leaf clusters.

Retirement 
On January 2, 2020, Pope Francis accepted Higgins's resignation as auxiliary bishop of the Archdiocese of the Military Services, USA, which he submitted upon reaching the age of 75 as required by canon law.

See also
 Military chaplain
 United States Air Force Chaplain Corps
 United States military chaplains

References

External links

 Archdiocese for the Military Services, USA Official Website
 Archdiocese for the Military Services of the United States. GCatholic.org. Retrieved 2010-08-20.

People from County Longford
21st-century American Roman Catholic titular bishops
United States Air Force officers
Irish emigrants to the United States
Recipients of the Legion of Merit
1944 births
Living people
United States Air Force chaplains
Roman Catholic Diocese of Sacramento
Chaplains